The 2017 West Coast Conference baseball tournament was held from May 25 through 27, 2017 at Banner Island Ballpark in Stockton, California. BYU won the four team, double-elimination tournament and earned the league's automatic bid to the 2017 NCAA Division I baseball tournament.

Seeding
The top four finishers from the regular season were seeded one through four based on conference winning percentage. The teams then played a double elimination tournament.

Tiebreakers:
Gonzaga went 3–0 against BYU and 2–1 against Loyola Marymount to earn the top seed.
Loyola Marymount went 2–1 against BYU to earn the second seed.
BYU went 1–2 against LMU and 0–3 against Gonzaga to earn the third seed.
Saint Mary's went 2–1 against San Diego to earn the fourth seed.

Results

All-Tournament Team
The following players were named to the All-Tournament Team.

Most Outstanding Player
Bronson Larsen, a senior catcher at BYU, was named Tournament Most Outstanding Player.

References

West Coast Conference Baseball Championship
Tournament
2017 in sports in California
Baseball competitions in Stockton, California
College baseball tournaments in California